Living a Dream is the third album by Welsh mezzo-soprano Katherine Jenkins, released on 31 October 2005, in the UK. It charted at number 4 on the UK Albums Chart and at number 1 on the UK Classical Album Chart.

Track listing 
 "L'Amore sei tu"
 "I Vow to Thee My Country"
 "One Fine Day (Un bel dì)"
 "Canto della Terra"
 "Music of the Night"
 "Nessun dorma"
 "Cinema Paradiso/Se"
 "Ebben? Ne andrò lontana"
 "Amazing Grace"
 "David of the White Rock"
 "All Things Bright and Beautiful"
 "Mon cœur s'ouvre à ta voix"
 "Over the Rainbow"
 "Torna a Surriento"
 "Do Not Stand At My Grave And Weep"
 "We'll Meet Again"

Charts

Certifications

References

Katherine Jenkins albums
2005 albums
Universal Classics and Jazz albums